Madhav Satwalekar (13 August 1915 – 2006) is considered an important 20th-century artist of India who achieved recognition for his depiction of scenes from contemporary life and landscape paintings.

Early life
Madhav Satwalekar was born in a Maharashtrian Karhade Brahmin family on 13 August 1915 in the city of Lahore in present-day Pakistan. His father, Shripad Damodar Satwalekar, the renowned turn-of-the-century painter and Vedic scholar had a studio in Lahore at that time. Satwalekar spent most of his childhood in the Princely State of Aundh where his father was the resident scholar, artist and advisor in the court of the then Maharaja.

Career as an artist
Satwalekar first studied at Sir J.J. School of Art in Bombay, before going to Europe (1937 to 1940) to study at Accademia di Belle Arti Firenze, (Italy), Slade School, (London) and Académie de la Grande Chaumière, Paris). He was recipient of  the Mayo Medal, the highest award of the J. J. School of Art in 1935.

For his paintings, Satwalekar used subjects such as landscapes paintings. Indian mythological Stories and the everyday life of the common people. He used both oil and watercolor for his works.

Exhibition of Satwalekar's work was first held in 1945, at the Taj Hotel in Mumbai. Over the years, apart from India, exhibitions of his work have been held in many parts of the world including the British East Africa in 1949, in countries of Europe, and the Middle East.

Later in his career, during the 1970s  and 1980s, Satwalekar served as the Director of Art for the Indian State of Maharashtra. He also co-founded  the Indian Art Institute for spreading awareness of art.

References

1915 births
Artists from Lahore
Indian male painters
2006 deaths
20th-century Indian painters
Painters from Maharashtra
Indian contemporary painters
Sir Jamsetjee Jeejebhoy School of Art alumni
20th-century Indian male artists
21st-century Indian male artists